Chingunjavi  (also known as Admiral Chingün, 1710–1757) was the Khalkha prince ruler of the Khotogoids and one of the two major leaders of the 1756-57 rebellion in Outer Mongolia. Although his rebellion failed, he is nowadays often hailed as a fighter for Outer Mongolia's independence from the Manchu-led Qing dynasty of China.

Early life and career

Chingünjav was born in 1710 at the shore of lake Sangiin Dalai nuur, in the Khotgoid's Erdenedüüregch vangiin khoshuu of Zasagt Khan aimag, or today's Bürentogtokh sum of Khövsgöl aimag. His father Bandi was the khoshuu's Zasag Noyon. In 1738, Chingünjav succeeded his father. Chingünjav made a career in the Manchu military and eventually reached the rank of an assistant general of Zasagt Khan aimag.

Conspiracy with Amursana

During the 1755 Manchu campaign against the Dzungar Khanate, Chingünjav and Amursana conspired to start a rebellion in autumn of the same year. However, their seniors discovered their plans and separated them. Chingünjav was sent to fight in Uriankhai, and Amursana was summoned to Beijing for demanding too big a share of the Dzungar Khanate. On the way, his escort let him escape. This led to the trial and execution of the commander of the escort, a brother of the Jebtsundamba Khutugtu and direct descendant of Chingis Khan, in early 1756, an event that gravely disturbed the Khalkha nobility.

Rebellion

In the summer of 1756, Chingunjav began his rebellion by leaving his post, gathering troops in his home area, and sending a letter to the Qianlong Emperor. However, although there was widespread unrest throughout Khalkha, support from other nobles and even from the 2nd Jebtsundamba Khutughtu was not forthcoming, and Chingünjav never managed to command more than 1,000-2,000 troops. By the time the Manchu were able to reinforce their loyal Outer Mongolian troops with detachments from Inner Mongolia, Chingünjav had achieved little more than spending time by waiting for an answer for his appeals to the nobility and the Jebtsundamba, and consequently was not able to face the Manchu in an open battle. He retreated northward towards the Darkhad area, with his force continuously shrinking through desertions.

Aftermath

Chingünjav, together with almost his whole family, was brought to Beijing and executed. The Manchu, although not as brutal as they had been towards the Dzungars, sent punitive units to Mongolia to deal on the spot with all those rebels they could find. Nobles that were suspected of having sympathized with Chingünjav were also executed. The Jebtsundamba Khutugtu "died" in 1758, the Tüsheet Khan shortly afterwards. The Qianlong Emperor declared that all future incarnations of the Jebtsundamba Khutugtu were to be found in Tibet to undermine local autonomy. On the other hand, the Mongolian debts to Chinese trading firms were partially annulled, and the rest being paid for by the emperor, in order to tackle the economic sources of the unrest in Khalkha.

Legacy
Although never having had a realistic chance to succeed, Chingünjav passed into the realm of folklore. A small monument has been raised at remains of a fort attributed to him, some kilometres south of Bürentogtokh, in 1978. A statue of him was erected in Mörön in 1992 and another one in 2010. In 2012, Mongolian Bronze Foundry created a monument in his honor in Ulaanbaatar, inscribed, "May our government and our children live prosperous and eternal".

Literature

Charles R. Bawden, The Modern History of the Mongols, London 1968, p. 114 - 134

References

External links
C. Kaplonski: Collective Memory and the Chingunjav Rebellion

Mongolia under Qing rule
Qing dynasty rebels
People from Khövsgöl Province
1710 births
1757 deaths
Mongolian military personnel